Transverse facial can refer to:
 Transverse facial artery
 Transverse facial vein, from the superficial temporal vein